is a JR West Geibi station located in 2-chōme, Nakamoto-chō, Shōbara, Hiroshima Prefecture, Japan. The station was a stop for the former Chidori and Taishaku express trains from Miyoshi.

History
 1923-12-08: Bingo-Shōbara Station opens.
 1987-04-01: Japan National Railways is privatized, and Bingo-Shōbara Station becomes a JR West station
 2002-03-23: Bingo-Shōbara Station becomes a kantaku station

Station layout
Bingo Shōbara Station features one side platform, and two platforms on either side of an island platform. There is an addition dead-end siding next to the station.
 Platform 1: Geibi Line (toward Miyoshi Station)
 Platform 2: Geibi Line (toward both Niimi Station and Miyoshi)
 Platform 3: Geibi Line

Around the station
Bingo Shōbara Station is located in downtown Shōbara. The Saijō River is located about 300m behind Bingo Shōbara Station. The Shōbara North Branch Post Office is about 200m west of the station.

Shōbara Elementary, Shōbara Junior High, two high schools are also located near the station.

Highway access
 Chūgoku Expressway
 Japan National Route 183
 Japan National Route 432
 Hiroshima Prefectural Route 61 (Miyoshi-Shōbara Route)
 Hiroshima Prefectural Route 231 (Shōbara Teishajō Route)
 Hiroshima Prefectural Route 422 (Naka Ryōke Shōbara Route)

External links
  JR West

Geibi Line
Railway stations in Hiroshima Prefecture
Railway stations in Japan opened in 1923
Shōbara, Hiroshima